Nicole "Nicki" Micheaux (born 1971) is an American actress, known for her role as Jennifer 'Jenn' Sutton in the ABC Family drama series Lincoln Heights (2007–2009), for which she received two NAACP Image Award for Outstanding Actress in a Drama Series nominations.

Early life
Micheaux was born in Detroit, Michigan, the daughter of a United States Army officer.

Career
Micheaux began her career appearing in supporting film roles and playing guest-starring parts on television shows include ER, Any Day Now and City of Angels. From 2001 to 2002, she had the recurring role on the Showtime drama series Soul Food. She later had the recurring roles on HBO drama Six Feet Under as Karla Charles and FX crime drama The Shield as Trish George. In film, Micheaux has appeared in Sweet Jane, Ringmaster (1998), The Trials of Cate McCall (2013) and The Pact 2 (2014). She also co-starred opposite Halle Berry in the 2005 television film Their Eyes Were Watching God.

From 2007 to 2009, Micheaux played Jennifer 'Jenn' Sutton in the ABC Family drama series Lincoln Heights. She received two NAACP Image Award for Outstanding Actress in a Drama Series nominations for her role on series. She also guest-starred on Brothers & Sisters, Castle and The Mentalist. In 2016, Micheaux was cast in a recurring role in the TNT drama series Animal Kingdom playing detective Sandra Yates. She later had a recurring role in Colony, S.W.A.T., Good Trouble, Shameless and In the Dark. She played the leading role in the 2017 comedy-thriller film, Lowlife receiving positive reviews from critics.

In 2023, Micheaux directed and wrote the period drama film Summer Of Violence.

Personal life
Micheaux was married and has two children. Micheaux has opted to keep her husband's identity private, saying "my husband is a comic book creator and makes superheroes, so he could never reveal his secret identity."

Filmography

Film

Television

References

External links
 

1971 births
Living people
Actresses from Detroit
American film actresses
American television actresses
African-American actresses
20th-century American actresses
21st-century American actresses
20th-century African-American women
20th-century African-American people
21st-century African-American women
21st-century African-American people